David Sulzer (born November 6, 1956) is an American neuroscientist and musician. He is a professor at Columbia University Medical Center in the departments of psychiatry, neurology, and pharmacology. Sulzer's laboratory investigates the interaction between the synapses of the cerebral cortex and the basal ganglia, including the dopamine system, in habit formation, planning, decision making, and diseases of the system.  His lab has developed the first means to optically measure neurotransmission, and has introduced new hypotheses of neurodegeneration in Parkinson's disease, and changes in synapses that produce autism  and habit learning.

Under the stage name Dave Soldier, he is known as a composer and musician in a variety of genres including avant-garde, classical, and jazz.

Scientific contributions

Studies on synapses 

Sulzer works on basal ganglia and dopamine neurons, brain cells of central importance in translating will to action. His team have introduced new methods to study synapses, including the first means to measure the fundamental "quantal" unit of neurotransmitter release from central synapses. They reported the first direct recordings of quantal neurotransmitter release from brain synapses using an electrochemistry technique known as amperometry, based on the method of Mark Wightman, a chemist at the University of North Carolina, to measure release of adrenaline from adrenal chromaffin cells. They showed that the quantal event at dopamine synapses consisted of the release of  about 3,000 dopamine molecules in about 100 nanoseconds. They further showed that the quantal events could "flicker" due to extremely rapid opening and closing of the a synaptic vesicle fusion pore (at rates as high as 4,000 times a second) with the plasma membrane. This approach also demonstrated that the "size" of the quanta could be altered in numerous ways, for example by the drug L-DOPA, a drug so used to treat Parkinson's disease.

Sulzer's lab, together with that of Dalibor Sames, a chemist at Columbia University, introduced "fluorescent false neurotransmitters", compounds that accumulated like genuine neurotransmitters into neurons and synaptic vesicles. This is used to observe neurotransmitter release and reuptake from individual synapses in video. Sulzer, along with his mentor Stephen Rayport, showed that the neurotransmitter glutamate is released from dopamine neurons, an important exception to the Dale's principle that a neuron releases the same transmitter from each of its synapses.

Addictive drugs
By introducing the "weak base hypothesis" of amphetamine action, for measuring amphetamine's effects on the quantal size of dopamine release, intracellular patch electrochemistry to measure dopamine levels in the cytosol, and providing real-time measurement of dopamine release by reverse transport, Sulzer's lab showed how amphetamine and methamphetamine release dopamine and other neurotransmitters and exert their synaptic and clinical effects. They showed how methamphetamine neurotoxicity occurs due to dopamine-derived oxidative stress in the cytosol followed by induction of autophagy, and with Nigel Bamford of the University of Washington, how these drugs activate long-term changes in the cortical synapses that project to the striatum. They call these "chronic postsynaptic depression" and "paradoxical presynaptic potentiation", which may explain drug dependence and addiction.

Sulzer explains in an interview on NOVA that his interest in understanding mechanisms of addiction stem from crashing a talk by William Burroughs at Naropa Institute in 1980, where Burroughs claimed that new synthetic opiates would be so powerful that users would become addicts with a single dose. In an interview in Nature Medicine on his lab's discovery of the mechanism by which nicotine filters synaptic noise and can focus attention to tasks, he recalls his father's early death due to smoking, saying "if some idiot or drug company is going to twist things around, the only thing that would come out of [this research] that I'd be horrified by is if people used it to advocate smoking. I think it would be a real travesty if that happened."

Neurological and psychiatric disease
Sulzer and his lab also studied nerve impulses in Parkinson's and Huntington's diseases, schizophrenia, drug addiction, and autism. They helped to establish the role of autophagy by lysosomes in neuronal disease. They showed the role of neuromelanin, the pigment of the substantia nigra, in methamphetamine neurotoxicity, and Huntington's disease. With Ana Maria Cuervo of Albert Einstein College of Medicine they showed that a cause of Parkinson's disease could be due to an interference with a chaperone-mediated autophagy caused by the protein alpha-synuclein. His work indicates that a lack of normal pruning of synapses could underlie the development of autism, and that in turn may also my due to inhibited neuronal autophagy in patients, due to overactivation of the mTOR pathway during childhood and adolescence.

In 2017, his lab introduced the role of autoimmune response in Parkinson's disease patients, which answers a century-old mystery on the role of immune system activation in that disorder.

The Sulzer lab has published over 200 papers on this research. For his work, Sulzer has received awards from the McKnight Foundation, the National Institute on Drug Abuse (NIDA), and NARSAD. He ran the Basic Neuroscience NIH / NIDA (T32) training program for postdoctoral research in basic neuroscience at Columbia.  He received a Ph.D. in biology from Columbia University in 1988. He founded the Gordon Conference on Parkinson's Disease, the Dopamine Society (with Louis-Eric Trudeau) and the journal Nature Parkinson's Disease (with Ray Chaudhuri).

Awards and honors

2020 - Youdim / Finberg Award, Hebrew University, Jerusalem, Israel

2020 - Raymond D. Adams Lecture, Harvard University, Mass General Hospital, Boston, Massachusetts, USA

2019 - Distinguished Lecture in Medicinal Chemistry, University of Minnesota, USA

2017 - Presidential Lecture, Society of Neuroimmune Pharmacology

2013 - Helmsley Award for Scientific Research

2012 - Keynote Lecture in Cellular Neuroscience, Yale University, New Haven, Connecticut, USA

2008 - McKnight Award in Neuroscience for Technical Innovation

1996 - James T. Shannon Award, National Institute on Drug Abuse, National Institutes of Health, USA

Art and Science projects

Sulzer wrote a book on scientific principles that underlie music and sound "Music Math and Mind" [Columbia University Press], 2021), and teaches a related course at Columbia University  on the physics and neuroscience of music and sound.

He co-ran the original science cafe, "Entertaining Science" from 2012 to 2019, with its founder (2002), chemist and writer Roald Hoffmann in Greenwich Village at the Cornelia Street Cafe .

With Brad Garton, he developed the "Brainwave Music Project", which allows users to create music from neural activity and enable teaching on brain function.

Music
Sulzer uses the alias, Dave Soldier, for his alternate career in music.

Music by animals
Many of Soldier's works are collaborative, such as with the Thai Elephant Orchestra which he co-founded with conservationist Richard Lair, based on the observation that elephants are said to enjoy listening to music. This ensemble consists of up to 14 elephants at the Thai Elephant Conservation Center near Lampang, and is listed by Guinness as the world's largest animal orchestra, with a combined weight of approximately 23 tonnes (50,706 lb).   He built giant musical instruments on which he trained the elephants to improvise: they eventually played on 22 instruments. The orchestra has released three CDs and play an abbreviated concert daily at the Conservation Center.

He also created  specially designed instruments for music played by zebra finches and bonobos, the latter in collaborations with physicist Gordon Shaw, who researched classical music's effect on the brain and introduced the Mozart effect.

Music by children
Soldier has made multiple recordings in which he coached child composers in different cultures.  He and flutist Katie Down coached free improvisation with The Tangerine Awkestra featuring 2-10 year old Brooklyn schoolchildren. Da HipHop Raskalz featured rap and dub tracks performed (including the instrumental tracks)  by 5-10 year old East Harlem children, who had no previous experience playing instruments. Sulzer and the santur player Alan Kushan produced Yol K'u with Mayan Indian children from the Seeds of Knowledge School in the high mountains of San Mateo Ixtatan, Guatemala, a collaboration using giant marimbas. He produced two CDs by Les Enfants des Tyabala, with the jazz musician Sylvian Leroux who coached children in Conakry, Guinea to form an ensemble and create works with the traditional Fula flute, which Leroux has adapted to play chromatic scales.

The Soldier String Quartet
In 1985 he founded the Soldier String Quartet, a punk chamber group that plays with amplification and a percussionist. As a leader, composer and violinist for the group, Soldier wrote and performed traditional pieces influenced by music styles including serialism, Delta blues and hip-hop. With inspiration from Haydn and Beethoven quartets, he explored anachronisms stemming from a classical ensemble playing in contemporary popular idioms, particularly rhythm and blues and punk rock.  With a drummer incorporated into the quartet, Soldier found that string instruments could play the blues in the hands of players who understood the contrasting styles, including violinists Regina Carter and Todd Reynolds.  The Soldier String Quartet also premiered and recorded works by other composers such as Elliott Sharp, Iannis Xenakis, Alvin Curran, Nicolas Collins, Butch Morris, Zeena Parkins, Leroy Jenkins and Phill Niblock, as well as with jazz musicians including Tony Williams and Amina Claudine Myers. They recorded with the rock and pop musicians Guided by Voices, Lambchop, Bob Neuwirth, Ric Ocasek, Van Dyke Parks, and Jesse Harris and were the touring and recording group for the Velvet Underground's John Cale from 1992 to 1998.

Experimental music
With Komar & Melamid, and inspired by their art project, "The People's Choice", Soldier wrote "The People's Choice: Music", with lyrics by Nina Mankin.  It was written according to answers from a survey of over 500 Americans, resulting in "The Most Wanted Song" and "The Most Unwanted Song".  The latter is over 22 minutes in length and features an operatic soprano rapping cowboy songs, holiday songs with a children's choir screaming advertisements, and political rants backed by bagpipe, banjo, tuba, piccolo, and church organ.

Soldier collaborates with the computer musician Brad Garton for the Brainwave Music Project, creating music played by performer's brainwaves using electroencephalograms.

He has a body of compositions using math derivations such as fractal manipulations, including a notorious 20 minute version of Chopin's Minute Waltz.

Concert music
Soldier's compositions with classical musicians include a socialist-realist opera, "Naked Revolution", based on paintings by the Russian conceptual artists Komar and Melamid, commissioned for the 25th anniversary of "The Kitchen".

The opera "The Eighth Hour of Amduat" uses as its text Italian translations of the ancient Egyptian of the book of Amduat and features Marshall Allen of the Sun Ra Arkestra playing the part of Sun Ra.

Soldier wrote two chamber operas in collaboration with author Kurt Vonnegut, "The Soldier's Story" and "Ice-9 Ballads", both recorded with Vonnegut playing characters in the operas.

Many of his  chamber and orchestra works were recorded by the Manhattan Chamber Orchestra under conductor Richard Auldon Clark and by the Composer's Concordance orchestra.  These include a collection of early Latin homoerotic lyrics in "Smut", and settings of Frederick Douglass in "The Apotheosis of John Brown" and Mark Twain in "War Prayer". The orchestra fanfare, "Samul Nori Overture", was commissioned by Kristjan Järvi and the Absolute Ensemble.

Chamber works by Soldier have been recorded by violinists Regina Carter and Miranda Cuckson, cellist Erik Friedlander, pianists Steven Beck, Taka Kigawa and Christopher O'Riley, accordionist William Schimmel, the PubliQuartet, singer Eliza Carthy, the choir Ekemeles, and flutist Robert Dick.

Rock music
Soldier performed in the early 1980s with Bo Diddley and founded The Kropotkins in the 1990s, a punk/country blues band with the Memphis singer Lorette Velvette and the drummers  drummer, Moe Tucker of The Velvet Underground, Charles Burnham of the James Blood Ulmer's Odyssey Band, and Jonathan Kane of Swans and La Monte Young's band; the Kropotkins recorded four albums and developed a cult following. He continued collaborations with Jonathan Kane in a symphonic minimalist blues duo known as Soldier Kane.

In the early 1980s, Soldier played guitar with Bo Diddley and various rock groups. He later worked as an arranger, violinist, or guitarist with John Cale, Guided by Voices, Van Dyke Parks, David Byrne, Ric Ocasek, Lee Ranaldo, Eliza Carthy, Maureen Tucker, Laurie Anderson, the Plastic People of the Universe, Jesse Harris, Pete Seeger, Richard Hell, and Bob Neuwirth.

Soldier led the touring group for John Cale, consisting of the Soldier String Quartet and B. J. Cole from 1992 to 1996, writing the groups arrangements for tours and several CDs and films including for Cale's scores for the Andy Warhol films "Eat" and "Kiss": his metal violin playing is featured on "Heartbreak Hotel" on Fragments of a Rainy Season. He led an flamenco/Middle Eastern rock group, The Spinozas, featuring lyrics from Arabic and Hebrew poetry from medieval Andalusia released on the album "Zajal".

Jazz
Soldier recorded as a multi-instrumentalist with the William Hooker Trio with Sabir Mateen and Roy Campbell, and has performed and recorded with Leroy Jenkins, Henry Threadgill, drummer Tony Williams, Jonas Hellborg, Butch Morris, Jason Hwang, William Parker (musician), Billy Bang, Marshall Allen of the Sun Ra Arkestra, Karl Berger, Teo Macero, Myra Melford, Michael Wolff and Amina Claudine Myers.

Production
Soldier co-founded the EEG Records (formerly Mulatta Records) label in 2000, for which he has produced a wide variety of recordings including contemporary flamenco music by Pedro Cortes, Texas singer/ songwriter Vince Bell with Bob Neuwirth, the 30 piece jazz string orchestra Spontaneous River by Jason Hwang, jazz drummer William Hooker, the traditional group Wofa from Guinea with American R&B musicians including Bernie Worrell; the jazz French horn virtuoso John Clark (musician), and released music by David First,  two albums of Fula flute music by Sylvain Leroux with children in Conakry, Guinea, Memphis musician Alex Greene, Ursel Schlicht, and Twink.

Personal life
Sulzer grew up in Carbondale in southern Illinois where he was exposed to music common to the area, particularly country and R&B. His earliest influences included James Brown and Isaac Hayes. He played viola, violin, piano, and eventually banjo and guitar. He moved with his family to Storrs, CT, at the age of 16, where he became enamoured with salsa music. He credits Eddie Palmieri's music as his inspiration to be a composer. He attended Michigan State University as an undergraduate and attempted a study of classical composition. He found that stultifying, however, and instead studied botany at the university and privately with the avant-garde jazz saxophonist/composer Roscoe Mitchell. He lived in Florida briefly, where he played guitar in Bo Diddley's band. 

He relocated to New York in 1981, and played in various salsa, classical, and rock-oriented bands in the early '80s. In New York he engaged in many collaborations with producer Giorgio Gomelsky, including running "The House Band", the Russian conceptual artists Komar and Melamid, and co-wrote two extended musical theater pieces with author Kurt Vonnegut. While attending graduate school in biology at Columbia University, he privately studied composition with the co-inventor of the synthesizer and "tape music" Otto Luening and formed his Soldier String Quartet in 1985. He co-founded Mulatta Records in 2000 to document his projects, including the Thai Elephant Orchestra and recordings with child improvisers, and to produce a broad range of unusual musical styles. 

Soldier  performed, recorded, composed, and arranged for television and film (Sesame Street, I Shot Andy Warhol), and pop and jazz acts ranging from Pete Seeger to David Byrne and Guided by Voices. In 2021, his book "Music, Math, and Mind" on the physics and neuroscience of music was published by Columbia University Press. Sulzer is married to biologist Francesca Bartolini.

Discography
Studio Albums as Leader

 1988 Sequence Girls: Soldier String Quartet
 1990 Romances From the Second Line piano music performed by Christopher O'Riley
 1991 Sojourner Truth: Soldier String Quartet
 1993 The Apotheosis of John Brown: oratorio with libretto from Frederick Douglass
 1994 War Prayer; with the Manhattan Chamber Orchestra with libretto from Mark Twain
 1994 Smut; with medieval Latin lyric poetry
 1996 She's Lightning When She Smiles: Soldier String Quartet 
 1997 The People's Choice: Music with Komar & Melamid: the Most Wanted and The Most Unwanted Songs
 1997 Jazz Standards on Mars: Soldier String Quartet with Robert Dick
 2000 The Tangerine Awkestra: with Katie Down and children from Fort Greene, Brooklyn
 2001 Thai Elephant Orchestra
 2001 Ice-9 Ballads: with Kurt Vonnegut as narrator and lyricist
 2004 Elephonic Rhapsodies: with the Thai Elephant Orchestra
 2004 Inspect for Damaged Gods: Soldier String Quartet
 2005 Soldier Stories: with Kurt Vonnegut as actor and librettist
 2006 Da Hiphop Raskalz: with children from East Harlem
 2006 Chamber Music: classical works for small ensembles, double CD
 2008 Yol K'u (Inside the Sun): Mayan Mountain Music with children from San Mateo Ixtatan, Guatemala
 2011 Water Music: with the Thai Elephant Orchestra
 2011 The Complete Victrola Sessions: works for violin and piano with Rebecca Cherry
 2012 Organum: solo organ works inspired by patterns in nature, performed by Walter Hilse
 2015 In Black & White: solo piano works, double CD, performed by Steven Beck
 2015 In Four Color: music for string quartet, performed by the Soldier String Quartet and the PUBLIQuartet
 2015 Smash Hits by the Thai Elephant Orchestra: with Richard Lair and Thai Elephant Orchestra
 2015 With Kurt Vonnegut: radio opera and song cycle with Kurt Vonnegut's narration and libretti, and the Manhattan Chamber Orchestra
 2016 Soldier Kane: duos composed and performed by Dave Soldier with Jonathan Kane
 2016 Dean Swift's Satyrs for the Very Very Young: featuring singer Eliza Carthy, Soldier's music for lyrics by Jonathan Swift 
 2016 The Eighth Hour of Amduat: opera for mezzo, choir, and orchestra featuring saxophonist Marshall Allen playing Sun Ra
 2017 History of the Kropotkins songs performed by  the Kropotkins
 2017 The Brainwave Music Project; with Brad Garton, Margaret Lancaster, William Hooker, Dan Trueman, Terry Pender, compositions for improvisers and brainwaves
 2018 Naked Revolution: a socialist realist opera based on immigrant dreams, with artists Komar and Melamid and Russian singers 
 2019 Zajal: songs from ancient Andalusia in medieval Arabic, Hebrew and Spanish with flamenco, middle eastern, salsa and jazz musicians
 2019 Jaleo: solo piano performed by Steven Beck
 2021 February Meets Soldier String Quartet: duos composed and performed by Dave Soldier with Jonathan Kane
 2021 Calo: solo violin works in flamenco forms performed by Miranda Cuckson with additional percussion by Jose Moreno and Pedro Cortes
 2022 Motet: Harmonies of the World: choir in just intonation performed by Ekmeles according to the book by Harmonices Mundi also known as Music of the Spheres by Johannes Kepler with lyrics by Proclus
 2022 LeWitt Etudes: experiments in group composition, co-led with William Hooker, featuring Etudes 7. 9. 16. 24, 39, 40, 43, 45, 48 with Luke Stewart, Kirk Knuffke, Rebecca Cherry, Alex Greene, Ken Filiano, Hans Tammen, Ishito AyumiCollaborations 1996 The Kropotkins;  performer, composer
 2000  the Kropotkins, Five Points Crawl; performer, composer
 2009  the Kropotkins, Paradise Square; performer, composer
 2015  the Kropotkins, Portents of Love; performer, composer
 1997  Robert Dick with the Soldier String Quartet, Jazz Standards on Mars: performer, arranger
 Arranger, performer:  John Cale, "Fragments From a Rainy Season", CD
 Arranger, conductor:  John Cale, "Paris S'Eveille", CD
 Arranger, conductor:  John Cale, "Antarida", CD
 Arranger, performer:  John Cale, " "Walking on Locusts" CD
 Arranger:  John Cale, "Dance Music" CD
 Arranger: Andy Warhol composed by John Cale "Eat/Kiss: Music for the Films by Andy Warhol" CD 
 Arranger: Christina Rosenvinge "Foreign Land" CD
 Arranger, performer: Guided by Voices "Isolation Drills", CD
 Arranger, performer: Guided by Voices  "Hold on Hope",  CD
 Arranger, performer: Guided by Voices "Do the Collapse" CDRecordings with the Soldier String QuartetLast Day on Earth; Bob Neuwirth, John Cale
Walking on Locusts, John Cale
Eat and Kiss, John Cale
Fragments From a Rainy Season, John Cale
Hammer Anvil Stirrup, Elliott Sharp
Larynx, Elliott Sharp
Tessalation Row, Elliott Sharp
Twistmap, Elliott Sharp
Abstract Repressionism, Elliott Sharp
Cryptoid Fragments, Elliott Sharp
Xeno-Codex, Elliott Sharp
Rheo/Umbra, Elliott Sharp
String Quartets 1986-1996, Elliott Sharp
Early Winter, Phill Niblock
Themes & Improvisations on the Blues, Leroy Jenkins
A Dark & Stormy Night, Nicolas Collins
The Word, Jonas Hellborg & Tony Williams
Third Stone from the Sun, Robert DickSidemanThe Ordinaires The Ordinaires (1987, Dossier) violin
 Lorette Velvette Lost Part of Me (1998, Veracity) banjo, violin 
 Elliott Sharp & Carbon Larynx (1987, SST) violin
 Bob Neuwirth & John Cale "Last Day on Earth" arranger, performer
 Le Nouvelles Polyponies Corses (Corsican Polyphony) Le Praiduisu (1999, Mercury) violin, arranger
 Sussan Deyhim Madman of God (1999, Crammed Disc) violin, remixed by Bill Laswell as Shy Angels (2008) 
While the Music Lasts, Jesse Harris
 William Hooker TrioYearn For Certainty: performer, trio with Sabir Mateen 2010
 William Hooker Trio Heart of the Sun: performer, trio with Roy Campbell Jr. 2013
 William Hooker Aria: performer, arranger 2016
 Mandeng Eletrik (2004, Mulatta) violin
 Elliott Sharp & Carbon Abstract Repressionism, violin (1992, Victo) violin
 Elliott Sharp & Carbon Syndakit, violin (1999, Zoar) violinFilm Scores Arranger: John Cale film scores: "Paris S'Eveille", "Antarida", "Walking on Locusts", "Dance Music"
 Arranger: films by Andy Warhol composed by John Cale "Eat/Kiss: Music for the Films by Andy Warhol"
 Arranger, Conductor:  Mary Harron director film score  I Shot Andy Warhol
 Arranger: Julian Schnabel director,  film score  Basquiat
 Composer: Vanessa Ly, director, film score Mekong Interior
 Composer: Nadia Roden, director, cartoon scores Sesame Street
 Composer: Winsome Brown, director, film score The Violinist
 Composer: Vicki Bennett, director, film score (partial)  Gesture Piece
 Composer: Dave Soldier, director, animation The Eighth Hour of Amduat
 Composer: Deborah Kampmeier, director, film score (partial), "Hounddog"
 Composer: Kate Taverna, Alan Adleson, directors, film score, "In Bed with Ulysses"
 Performer: Phill Niblock, director, "China"Producer'''

 Jason Kao Hwang and Spontaneous River Orchestra Symphony of Souls CD, Mulatta Records, 2013
 Pedro Cortes Los Viejos Non Mueren CD, Mulatta Records, 2014
 Sylvain Leroux with children from Conakry, Guinea Les Enfants de Tyabala and Tyabla CDs, Mulatta Records, 2015, 2019
 Archer Spade Orbital Harmony CD, Mulatta Records, 2015
 William Hooker Aria: performer, producer, 2016 
 John Clark Sonus Inenarrabilis (Mulatta Records), works for 9 piece chamber group, CD, Mulatta Records, 2016
 Robert Dick and Ulrike Lentz Are There? (Mulatta Records), flute duos CD, Mulatta Records, 2017
 Vince Bell Ojo (Mulatta Records), co-production with Bob Neuwirth, Mulatta Records, 2018
 William Hooker Pillars ... at the Portal, Multatta Records, 2018

Compositions for Classical Musicians

References

Additional sources
 Ratcliff, Carter. Komar and Melamid, New York: Abbeville Press, 1988. 
 Wypijewski, JoAnn, ed.  Painting by Numbers: Komar and Melamid's Scientific Guide to Art, New York: Farrar Straus Giroux, 1997.  
 Komar and Melamid.  When Elephants Paint: The Quest of Two Russian Artists to Save the Elephants of Thailand, New York: HarperCollins, 2000. 
 Weiss, Evelyn. Komar & Melamid: The Most Wanted and the Most Unwanted Painting'', Museum Ludwig Koln, Ostfildern: Cantz, 1997.

External links
Sulzer lab, Columbia University: homepage
Scientific articles
The Department of Neuroscience | DEPARTMENT OF NEUROSCIENCE
Sulzer lab, Columbia University, research directions
Entertaining Science – The Back Story
Dave Soldier at Mulatta Records

Dave Soldier Music Blog
Brainwave Music Project at Columbia University

Interviews
PDONLINERESEARCH.ORG
Dave Sulzer | Secret: Elephant Music | Secret Lives of Scientists - YouTube

1956 births
Living people
American neuroscientists
Columbia University faculty
American male musicians
American multi-instrumentalists
People from Carbondale, Illinois
American classical composers
Songwriters from Illinois
Record producers from Illinois
American male songwriters
Michigan State University alumni
University of Florida alumni
Columbia Graduate School of Arts and Sciences alumni